Family is the ninth studio album by American singer LeAnn Rimes, released October 9, 2007, by Curb Records in the United States. It was produced primarily by musician and record producer Dann Huff, with additional production by Tony Brown and guest vocalist Reba McEntire.

Family is the first album in Rimes' career where she has co-written every song for an album.

The album debuted at number four on the US Billboard 200 chart, selling 74,200 copies in its first week. Upon its release, Family received positive reviews from most music critics, who complimented Rimes' performance and songwriting. The lead single "Nothin' Better to Do" earned her a Grammy Award nomination for Best Female Country Vocal Performance while the third single "What I Cannot Change" also earned her a nomination the following year .

Singles 
The first single, "Nothin' Better to Do", was released to radio on May 29, 2007 which she was nominated for a Best Female Country Vocal Performance Grammy for the 50th Grammy Awards, followed by "Good Friend and a Glass of Wine" and "What I Cannot Change," which was nominated for a Best Female Country Vocal Performance Grammy for the 51st Grammy Awards and went to number one on the Billboard Dance chart.

Reception

Commercial performance 
The album debuted at number four on the US Billboard 200 chart, with first-week sales of 74,200 copies in the United States. It spent a total of 20 weeks in Billboard 200. As of July 2011 it has sold 401,000 copies in United States.

In the United Kingdom, Family debuted at number 31 on the UK Albums Chart, becoming Rimes's first album to miss the top 20 of the chart (though not all of her albums were released in the UK).

Critical response 

Family received positive reviews from most music critics. At Metacritic, which assigns a normalized rating out of 100 to reviews from mainstream critics, the album received an average score of 70, based on 12 reviews, which indicates "generally favorable reviews". Allmusic editor Stephen Thomas Erlewine gave it four out of five stars and called it "surprisingly far-ranging underneath its soft country-pop veneer [...] a canny blend of the commercial and the confessional". Blenders Jane Dark complimented its "lighthearted genre-hopping", writing that it "suggests nothing so much as a Broadway smash about a restless country star, borrowing from many styles, beholden to none." Sarah Rodman of The Boston Globe praised Rimes' songwriting and dubbed Family "the best, most cogent album of her career". Kelefa Sanneh of The New York Times complimented her "gentle belting-out" and commented that "the music echoes the fearlessness in the lyrics". Slant Magazine's Jonathan Keefe called Rimes "a distinctive interpretive singer" and viewed that her songwriting gives the album "the kind of focus and thematic coherence that most Nashville acts can't be bothered with". Keefe cited Family as "among the strongest mainstream country albums of the past several years". Ken Tucker of Billboard gave the album a favorable review and said, "It took personal experience for LeAnn Rimes to get to the point where she could write, record and release Family, the sum of a so-far extraordinary but still young life. But just because it's a personal album doesn't mean it doesn't speak to the masses."

However, Q gave the album two out of five stars and stated "There's little spark, despite her admirable willingness to take chances." Entertainment Weeklys Alanna Nash gave it a B rating and commented that "Rimes displays new maturity in songwriting [...] though too often she lapses into posturing power pop". Adam Sweeting of Uncut criticized its music, writing that the songs "sound like an update of the kind of AOR racket Pat Benatar and Heart were making in the '80s". Dave Simpson of The Guardian noted "A slightly too-smooth production and typically overblown Bon Jovi collaboration", but called it "an album full of swaggering rhythm'n'booze and emotional confessionals that explore a dysfunctional childhood". Despite finding the song "uneven", Rolling Stone writer Rob Sheffield gave the album three-and-a-half out of five stars and cited "Nothin' Better to Do", "Family", and "Till We Ain't Strangers Anymore" as highlights. Thomas Kintner of The Hartford Courant called Family "a carefully manicured, but still lively assortment that highlights her substantial vocal strengths", and praised Rimes' singing, stating "She is prone to embracing tunes so disposable that they should be beneath her notice, but the melodic richness she showers on even the most lackluster lyrics makes for interesting listening".

Track listing

Personnel 
Credits for Family adapted from Allmusic.

Musicians

 Tim Akers – keyboards, Hammond organ, Wurlitzer
 Jon Bon Jovi – vocals on "Till We Ain't Strangers Anymore"
 Marc Broussard - vocals on "Nothing Wrong"
 Tom Bukovac – electric guitar
 John Catchings – cello
 Eric Darken – percussion
 Mark Douthit – tenor saxophone
 Dan Dugmore – steel guitar
 Paul Franklin – steel guitar
 Carl Gorodetzky – violin
 Barry Green – trombone
 Kenny Greenberg – electric guitar
 Mike Haynes – trumpet
 Dann Huff – acoustic guitar
 Rami Jaffee – Hammond organ
 Joanna Janét – background vocals
 Charles Judge – keyboards, programming, string arrangements, conductor, synthesizer
 Russ Kunkel – drums
 Tim Lauer – accordion, Casio, Farfisa organ, keyboards, Mellotron, Hammond organ, piano, solina, synthesizer
 Reba McEntire – vocals on "When You Love Someone Like That"
 Chris McHugh – drums
 JayDee Mannes – steel guitar
 Stuart Mathis – electric guitar
 Doug Moffet – baritone saxophone
 Steve Nathan – Hammond organ, piano
 Michael Omartian – horn arrangements
 Carole Rabinowitz-Neuen – cello
 LeAnn Rimes – lead vocals, background vocals
 Matt Rollings – Hammond organ, piano
 Pamela Sixfin – violin
 Leland Sklar – bass guitar
 Jimmie Lee Sloas – bass guitar
 Michael Thompson – acoustic guitar, electric guitar
 Kris Wilkinson – viola
 Jonathan Yudkin – banjo, fiddle, mandola

Production

 Derek Bason – engineer
 Drew Bollman – assistant
 Tony Brown – producer
 Mike Butler – engineer
 Terry Christian – engineer
 John Coulter – design
 Richard Dodd – engineer
 Ben Fowler – engineer
 Darrell Franklin – A&R
 Mike "Frog" Griffith – project coordinator
 Mark Hagen – engineer, overdub engineer
 Nathaniel Hawkins – hair stylist
 Nate Hertweck – assistant
 Dann Huff – producer
 Scott Kidd – assistant
 David McClister – photography
 Reba McEntire – producer
 Steve Marcantonio – mixing
 J.C. Monterrosa – assistant
 John Netti – assistant
 Justin Niebank – mixing
 Lowell Reynolds – assistant
 Troy Surratt – make-up
 Todd Tidwell – assistant

Charts

Weekly charts

Year-end charts

Release history

References

External links 
 
 Family at Discogs
 Family at Metacritic

LeAnn Rimes albums
Asylum-Curb Records albums
2007 albums
Albums produced by Dann Huff
albums produced by Tony Brown (record producer)